Passiflora ambigua is a species of Passiflora from Mexico, Belize, Costa Rica, and Colombia.

References

External links
 

ambigua
Flora of Colombia
Plants described in 1902